Malinconico can refer to:

 , performance direction in music meaning melancholy
 Nicola Malinconico (1663–1721), Neapolitan painter 
 Andrea Malinconico (1624-1698), Neapolitan painter

See also
Melancholic Autumn (Italian: Malinconico autunno), a 1958 Italian-Spanish melodrama film